Kudakwashe is a Zimbabwean given name that may refer to
Kudakwashe Basopo (born 1990), Zimbabwean association football player
Kudakwashe Mahachi (born 1993), Zimbabwean association football player
Prince Kudakwashe Musarurwa (born 1988), Zimbabwean African jazz singer, songwriter and producer 
Kudakwashe Musharu (born 1987), Zimbabwean association football player